KaRon Rashad Coleman (born May 22, 1978) is a former American football running back who played three seasons with the Denver Broncos of the National Football League. He played college football at Stephen F. Austin State University and attended Elkins High School in Missouri City, Texas. He was also a member of the Houston Texans and Ottawa Renegades.

Professional career

Denver Broncos
Coleman played for the Denver Broncos from 2000 to 2002. He was released by the Broncos on July 29, 2003.

Houston Texans
Coleman signed with the Houston Texans on August 16, 2004. He was released by the Texans on August 30, 2004.

Ottawa Renegades
Coleman spent the 2005 season with the Ottawa Renegades.

References

External links
Just Sports Stats
DENVER CHURCH PLANTER CAN’T BE SIDELINED
Pastor KaRon Coleman
Don't Count Me Out: When Something Little Becomes Big by KaRon Coleman

Living people
1978 births
Players of American football from Texas
Sportspeople from Harris County, Texas
American football running backs
Canadian football running backs
African-American players of American football
African-American players of Canadian football
Stephen F. Austin Lumberjacks football players
Denver Broncos players
Ottawa Renegades players
People from Missouri City, Texas
21st-century African-American sportspeople
20th-century African-American sportspeople